= SETCA LLP =

1930s French aircraft

LLP

General information
- Type: Tourism aircraft
- National origin: France
- Manufacturer: Société d'Études Techniques et de Constructions Aéronautiques (SETCA)
- Number built: 1

History
- First flight: 1937

The SETCA LLP Petrel was a tourism aircraft built in France in the late 1930s by Société d'Études Techniques et de Constructions Aéronautiques (SETCA).

== Specifications (LLP) ==
Data from

General characteristics

- Crew: 4
- Length: 7.90 m (25 ft 11 in)
- Wingspan: 11.80 m (38 ft 9 in)
- Powerplant: 2 × Régnier 4E.0 4-cylinder inverted air-cooled in-line piston engines, 67 kW (90 hp) each

Performance

- Maximum speed: 275 km/h (171 mph, 148 kn)
